Vada Chennai is a 2018 Indian Tamil-language action crime drama film written and directed by Vetrimaaran in his fourth film as a director. It is the first instalment in a planned trilogy. Produced by A. Subaskaran's Lyca Productions and Dhanush's Wunderbar Films with Vetrimaaran's Grass Root Film Company, it stars Dhanush as Anbu, a skilled carrom player who becomes a reluctant participant in a gang war between two rival gangsters. Along with Dhanush, Andrea Jeremiah, Aishwarya Rajesh, Ameer, Samuthirakani, Daniel Balaji, Kishore and Pawan  appear in prominent roles.

The film had been in the news since late 2009 with an official announcement only made in November 2011 that the filming would commence by March 2012. After being temporarily shelved, the film re-materialized in May 2015 with a new cast; featuring Dhanush as the lead, making his third collaboration with the director after Polladhavan (2007) and Aadukalam (2011). Principal photography for the film which was commenced in June 2016, was wrapped up in February 2018. The cinematography for the film was done by Velraj, editing handled by G. B. Venkatesh and R. Ramar, and musical score is composed by Santhosh Narayanan.

Vada Chennai was initially slated to release on 13 September 2018, during the Ganesh Chathurthi festival was postponed to 17 October 2018, because of the post-production works. The film received critical acclaim, praising the Direction, screenplay, music, action sequences, script and the performances of the cast (particularly that of Dhanush, Ameer, Samuthirakani, Pawan, Kishore, Daniel Balaji and Andrea), while criticising the dialogues. Post-release, the film drew controversies, about the fishermen community in which few scenes from the film found offensive, after the director decided to remove the scenes from the movie, and added further new scenes. 

The film received several awards at the 2018 Ananda Vikatan Cinema Awards, including Best Actor for Dhanush, Best Supporting Actor for Ameer and Best Music Director for Santhosh Narayanan. At the 8th South Indian International Movie Awards, the film received several nominations, including Best Actor for Dhanush, which was the only win at the ceremony. The film was nominated at three categories at the 66th Filmfare Awards South, in which Dhanush won the Filmfare Award for Best Actor. A sequel and a prequel for the film was planned by Vetrimaaran, which will be made into a web series.

Plot 
The film follows a non-linear narrative.

1987: Guna, "Jawa" Pazhani, Velu, and Senthil kill a "high profile" don at a restaurant in North Madras (Madras is the former name of Chennai, the capital of Tamil Nadu state in India). Senthil requests Guna and Velu to surrender for the murder while he bails them out. A year later, the pair is still in prison, and it creates a deep rift between them and Senthil, despite Mani and Thambi, the dead don's younger brother intervening.

2000: The new warden of the Madras Central Prison plans to weed out all nefarious activities in the prison, which are being controlled by Senthil from the 7th Block. Senthil sells drugs worth millions every month in a very elaborate manner, and never steps out of the 7th Block, fearing for his life from Guna's men in the 11th Block. Anbu and Velu's brother Siva is brought into the prison for fighting. Anbu saves one of Senthil's henchmen, Raju, from being killed by Siva. Anbu is placed in the 11th Block under Velu and Mani. During a raid, he gives away a mobile phone belonging to Mani and is almost killed for doing so, before being saved by the warden. He is shown to have saved his right hand from any injury, while being attacked.

1991: Anbu, Carrom, & Padma

Anbu, a 20 year-old skilled carrom player, whose friend Siva often gets him to play bet matches. On the night Rajiv Gandhi is assassinated, the entire hamlet where Anbu lives loots nearby shops and makes away with various goods. A masked girl steals a sewing machine from Anbu, but he lets her go. The next morning, local cops, along with Thambi, come to recover the stolen goods. Despite having his goods returned, the shopkeeper is keen on filing a complaint against Anbu, as Anbu had hit him the previous night, under the pretext of not returning the sewing machine. Anbu, in turn, goes and accosts the girl, Padma, but she refuses to return it. Anbu gets beaten up by the shopkeeper and loses badly in that year's carrom tournament. Anbu and Padma begin a relationship, during the course of which Anbu saves Guna from contract killers during a festival. The killers reveal that they are Senthil's men, and things only worsen between Guna and Senthil.

2000: Raju helps Anbu shift to the 7th Block after he cleverly smuggles in contraband for Raju. Meanwhile, Senthil is still trying to harbour political aspirations through a local politician named Muthu, who is also in prison.

1996: Anbu, Padma, & Pazhani

Pazhani teases Padma after she and Anbu are caught kissing. Pazhani also beats up Padma's brother Kannan. Anbu goes to speak to Pazhani but is beaten up as well. After no one is willing to help Anbu, he and Kannan go back with weapons belonging to Guna's brother, to threaten him but end up killing Pazhani. Pazhani's men chase the two, but they escapes without being identified.

2000: Anbu requests Senthil to organise a carrom tournament for the prisoners, which will also help Senthil to make peace with the strict prison Chief and also promote his political aspirations. The tournament is conducted throughout the prison. Senthil, Siva and Anbu all proceed to the knock-out semi-finals. The final two rounds of the tournament are held in the common prison courtyard, which implies that Senthil must come out. Velu and Mani try to utilise the opportunity to kill Senthil and heavily arm their boys. Senthil is alerted and gets ready to kill his to be assassins with their own weapons. However, Senthil's right thumb is injured accidentally, and he withdraws from the tournament. Anbu and Siva proceed to the finals, and Anbu requests Senthil to be present for the finals to raise morale. Senthil agrees and comes to watch the final. Seconds after Anbu wins the final, the tournament tent is collapsed, and two gangs clash. Senthil is able to aptly defend himself. However, Anbu stabs Senthil in the neck with a wooden shard broken from the carrom board, leaving him heavily injured and paralysed for life. Raju is the only witness but does not talk as Anbu spared his life from Siva earlier. Anbu then explains his loyalty towards Guna, to Raju.

1996: Anbu, Guna, & Chandra

After Anbu and Kannan killed Pazhani, Thambi sent them to Guna. While Guna tells the two to leave to someplace afar, Guna's wife Chandra convinces Guna to send his own brother Shankar in Anbu's place to prison, as it will benefit everyone. Guna accepts and Anbu and Kannan are placed on boats for safety. Senthil murders Shankar in prison within two days, leading to Anbu pledging his life to Guna. Sometime later, while trying to confirm a party post, Senthil surrenders himself to the cops and calls for a truce with Guna, but Guna discovers that Senthil has requested Guna and Velu's names to the police hit list. Meanwhile, Anbu goes to Padma's house to ask for her hand, which her father refuses. But with help from Kannan, he brings Padma to his home. At the same time, Guna calls Anbu to help him and provides him with a plan to gain Senthil's trust in prison and subsequently kill him.

2000: Anbu is bailed out of prison by Guna but tells him that he does not want to work for Guna and wants to hone carrom players instead. Anbu then marries Padma.

2003: At a coming-of-age ceremony for Thambi's daughter, a road contractor requests Guna and Senthil to come together to help in evicting people from Anbu's hamlet with the promise of houses and jobs. Anbu's friend and Bank officer Hameed have petitioned against the project, and Guna requests Anbu's help to talk Hameed out of it. Anbu then tells everything to Padma, including Rajan's story and how he had fought for the local people.

1987: Anbu, Rajan, and the Hood

Rajan is the biggest smuggler in North Madras and works for Muthu, who is the MLA of that area. Muthu requests Rajan's help with clearing out the hamlets for a road project, which was initiated for the Pope's visit. Rajan stands against Muthu and vows to protect his hood and stops his smuggling activities. He also marries Chandra. Muthu, seeing that Rajan will not help him, informs the cops about his smuggling activities. When the cops come, Rajan kidnaps the ACP and refuses to let him go until the road project is called off. Rajan is hailed a hero in the hood for stopping the project. When the Chief Minister of Tamil Nadu MGR dies, Rajan goes to his funeral.

Muthu, meanwhile, instigates Senthil to smuggle contraband using college students of their area, and then tips the police, leading to the youngster getting arrested. Senthil, Guna, Velu, and Pazhani are beaten up and publicly humiliated by Rajan for working against his wishes, and they hence plot Rajan's death. That night, they get Thambi to call Rajan to a hotel where Rajan tells them that he will help them become big. He tells that he has arranged for release of the boys and he bet them just to pacify the families of those boys. They are hesitant to kill him, but when their plot gets revealed, they hack Rajan (the dead man from the opening scene) to death. Rajan, while dying, requests Thambi to refrain from doing anything and let things be. Chandra vows to avenge Rajan's death.

2003: At the meeting with the road contractor, Anbu, like Rajan, makes a stand for the people of the hood and refuses to endorse the project. Guna, enraged that Anbu went up against him, lets Senthil's brother-in-law Kumar, a cop, know that it was Anbu who stabbed Senthil. Chandra then reveals how she was behind everything that happened. She had sent men to kill Guna during the festival, but Anbu saved him. She decides to marry Guna and to use him to help kill the other three involved in Rajan's death. She added Guna and Velu's names to the hit list and drives a wedge between Guna and Velu. She gets Guna to leave the hood with her. She sends Rajan's men to help protect Anbu from Kumar. Kumar finds Anbu but is heavily beaten up by him.

Anbu then traps Guna and Chandra as they leave the hood and warns Guna to leave him and hood alone. Chandra covertly gives Rajan's old home to Anbu. The film ends with Anbu taking up Rajan's cause of fighting for the people.

Cast 

 Dhanush as Anbu, a skilled carrom player who gets involved in a gang war later, Padma's husband
 Ameer as Rajan, a prominent local Fishermen Head in North Madras who is respected by the locals, Chandra's husband
 Samuthirakani as Guna, a member of Rajan's gang and Chandra's second husband
 Daniel Balaji as Thambi, Rajan's younger brother
 Kishore as Senthil, a member of Rajan's gang
 Pawan as Velu, a member of Rajan's gang and Siva's elder brother
 Andrea Jeremiah as Chandra, Rajan's wife who later marries Guna
 Aishwarya Rajesh as Padma, Anbu's love interest later wife
 Subathra Robert as Senthil's wife
 Sai Dheena as "Jawa" Pazhani, member of Rajan's gang
 Radha Ravi as Muthu, a politician and Rajan's ex-boss
 Subramaniam Siva as Mani, a man who works alongside Velu and Anbu
 Vincent Asokan as Asst. Commissioner of Police
 Rajesh Sharma as Chanchal
 Saran Shakthi as Kannan, Padma's younger brother
 Hari Krishnan  as Raju, Senthil's henchman
 Pavel Navageethan as Siva, Velu's younger brother
 Ragavendhar as Rasigan
 Munnar Ramesh as Rajan's friend
 G. Marimuthu as a doctor
 Sendrayan as Locality Resident (cameo appearance)

Production

Origin 
Vetrimaaran developed the story of Vada Chennai in 2003 when he met an unnamed person in the streets of North Chennai, to narrate a script about bike theft, in which he tried to explore about gangsterism and the rise and fall of mafia gangs in North Chennai. But he later decided to work on Polladhavan (2007), with Dhanush in the lead, and then, on Aadukalam (2011). During the production of Aadukalam, Vetrimaaran simultaneously scripted and modified the project. It was announced that Karthi signed the film, in October 2009. In February 2010, it was revealed that the film would see Karthi, play the lead role of a fisherman, who is drawn into a mafia gang, unwillingly. Dayanidhi Azhagiri was confirmed to produce the project, under Cloud Nine Movies, and Anushka Shetty, was announced as the female lead, who would play a Marwari girl. However, talks with Karthi fell through, after the film went through delays. In July 2010, Vetrimaaran revealed that discussions were being held with three other actors, to replace Karthi in the lead role. The film made news, without an official announcement, over the next year. Following the huge success of Aadukalam, Vetrimaaran began considering other scripts, instead.

In October 2011, the producers announced that the film would re-start soon and feature Silambarasan, as the main lead, in place of Karthi. Rana Daggubati and Kishore were cast in other pivotal roles, with Vetrimaaran adding that the story of Vada Chennai was first written in 2003, and that he took notes from the first script, to make his other two films. Vetrimaaran's usual team, consisting of cinematographer Velraj, editor Kishore T.E., art director Jacki, and music director G. V. Prakash Kumar, from Polladhavan and Aadukalam, were retained and confirmed to be part of the main crew. The director confirmed that Andrea Jeremiah would also play a pivotal supporting role. Divya Spandana, who previously worked with Vetrimaaran in Polladhavan, was approached for a role in January 2012, but she did not sign the film. In a turn of events, Rana Daggubati opted out of the film, in February 2012, citing date issues and the delay of the film. Furthermore, it was alleged that the delay of the film had also irked Silambarasan, with reports suggesting that Jiiva would replace him, if Silambarasan walked out of the project. In April 2012, Dayanidhi Azhagiri announced that the project was postponed and announced that Vetrimaaran would move on to make another film for his production house, with Dhanush in the lead. Vetrimaaran subsequently contemplated making several different projects with the actor in the lead, before beginning filming for Soodhadhi in March 2014. Months into production, the film was postponed, like Vada Chennai.

Development 

In May 2015, Dhanush revealed that he would produce and feature in Vada Chennai, and that the venture would restart production, in September 2015. Samantha and Andrea Jeremiah were revealed to be among the lead actresses, while Santhosh Narayanan would be the film's composer, after Dhanush had fallen out with G. V. Prakash Kumar. Also, G. B. Venkatesh, who assisted Kishore Te on Visaranai (2016), was roped in as the film editor, after the latter's unfortunate demise, due to his health problems. The start of the project was postponed until 2016, as Dhanush had to complete his outstanding projects, first. In August 2015, Vetrimaaran announced that Vada Chennai will be made into two-parts, citing Anurag Kashyap's advice to split the film into two, similar to his Gangs of Wasseypur films. Dhanush decided to allot more than 200 days for his role, for both the parts. However, with Lyca Productions's inclusion in the project, the film was extended into a trilogy. Unlike his previous films which were inspired by other works, including novels and films, Vada Chennai is an original and fictional representation revolving around gangsters in North Chennai.

In late 2015, the team held talks with Jiiva and Vijay Sethupathi, again, for portraying other pivotal characters in the film, though neither of them signed the project. Samuthirakani and Daniel Balaji were subsequently signed on to portray other pivotal roles. Likewise several actors who have previously worked on Vetrimaaran's films such as Kishore, Karunas and Pawan, joined the cast during June 2016. Before the film's shoot started, Samantha opted out of the film citing schedule conflicts, and was replaced by Amala Paul in the lead female role. Vijay Sethupathi also agreed to portray an extended cameo in the film, with Dhanush announcing his inclusion during July 2016. However, owing to a delay in the film's shooting, both Vijay Sethupathi and Amala Paul exited the project, with the pair being replaced by Ameer and Aishwarya Rajesh. Before Sethupathi's replacement with Ameer, it was reported that he left the project due to scripting and call-sheet issues, and Vetrimaaran decided to rope in Telugu actor, Ravi Teja, for the role, as he was impressed with the script and role. However, he also could not take up the role, due to his ongoing projects in Tollywood.

Pre-production 

Art director Jacki, worked on the film's production design. The set design for Vada Chennai began nearly six years ago and before the beginning of the production, Jacki designed huge sets resembling the Central Jail and had made the team cost . The team initially decided to shoot the portions of the film in a real jail set in Rajamahendravaram, but as the prison portions may become lengthy during the course of the film, they decided to construct a huge set resembling the Madras Central Prison at the Binny Mills in Chennai. He visited the original location and also met a prisoner from Madras Prison to give inputs for the location. The construction initially planned for 43 days, was completed within 40 days. Later, the team had erected another set resembling the Nagoorar Thottam and for that design, the team had spent 20 days. Then, as most of the film being set in the slum area, the team did a miniature model of the design which they planned to replicate in real. To reflect the timeline change (1970–2000), the team went through an extensive research and collected every minute details of the products, including furnitures, materials, home appliances, posters, cigarettes, advertisements and essentials used, which the team had considered as "the biggest challenge". Amritha Ram worked on the costumes for the film. A report from Sify claimed that the film is the "costliest film ever made in Dhanush's career" as Jacki had stated that the work on the production design escalated the costs in the film.

Filming 

The film's production began on 22 June 2016, after multiple postponements. The first schedule of the shooting was held at a huge set resembling the Madras Central Prison which was erected at Binny Mills in Chennai. The shoot continued throughout mid-2016 in North Chennai for thirty days, with scenes depicting the 1970s shot. The production was briefly delayed as Vetrimaaran sought to get his previous film, Visaranai, ready for nominations at the 89th Academy Awards, which prompted Dhanush to move on to work on his other projects: his directorial debut Pa Paandi, Velaiilla Pattadhari 2 and his international debut film, The Extraordinary Journey of the Fakir. The break between schedules also meant that Vetrimaaran began pre-production work on another film starring G. V. Prakash Kumar, which he would make following the completion of the first part of Vada Chennai. However, it was revealed that Vetrimaaran was not ready to work simultaneously on the three parts of the film and reported that they may take a break in-between the production of the trilogy, where Dhanush and Vetrimaaran planned for three-to-four films in the process.

The second filming schedule began in April 2017 in Royapuram, Chennai, and progressed for 30 days. However, the shooting further affected as Dhanush had worked on The Extraordinary Journey of the Fakir. It was revealed that the team had completed 90% of the shooting within late-June 2017, and only 10–15 days of shooting left. But during the film's production, Dhanush also prioritised to work on the long delayed Gautham Menon's project Enai Noki Paayum Thota and Maari 2, which escalated the film's delay. Later, Dhanush decided to work on both the projects simultaneously, in order to complete the shoots of both the films within time. The filming was completed within February 2018.

Music 
The film was initially announced with G. V. Prakash Kumar as the music director. However, following Kumar's fallout with the lead actor Dhanush, the team chose Santhosh Narayanan as the film composer, which marked his maiden collaboration with Vetrimaaran. Dhanush suggested Santhosh's name when he composed for one of his production, the Rajinikanth-starrer Kaala (2018), and with his inclusion, he simultaneously worked for both the films; the work on the entire album was completed within June 2018. The album is mostly based North Madras music consisting of a diverse genres – gaana, folk and melody. Vada Chennai also marked Santhosh's 25th filmas a composer in his career. The album was released on 23 September 2018, in entirety through the internet and in streaming platforms such as Saavn, JioMusic and Gaana. The soundtrack received rave reviews from critics and audience, and topped the iTunes charts within three days of its release. It was also streamed above 5,00,000 times on Saavn. An additional song titled "Patta Patti" was released during mid-November 2018, after repeated requests from fans.

Marketing and release 
Vetrimaaran worked on the post-production of Vada Chennai, assembling the final cut of the film during mid-May 2018. In June 2018, the makers confirmed that Vada Chennai will be released theatrically on the occasion of Ganesh Chathurthi (13 September 2018). The teaser trailer for the film was unveiled on the occasion of Dhanush's birthday (28 July 2018) and received positive response from fans. Furthermore, celebrities such as Shah Rukh Khan and Anurag Kashyap praised Dhanush and Vetrimaaran's work in the teaser. The makers unveiled a set of posters featuring the lead characters starting from 6 August 2018. In mid-August, Dhanush announced that Vada Chennai, will be released worldwide on 17 October 2018, coinciding the Dusshera weekend. The film was premiered at the Pingyao International Film Festival in China before the theatrical release, and also premiered at the 23rd International Film Festival of Kerala in November 2018. The merchandise of Vada Chennai, was launched by Cover It Up and Fully Filmy on 15 October 2018, as a part of the film's promotion.

Four days before the theatrical release, the film was sent to the Central Board of Film Certification (CBFC), where it received an A certificate, due to "raw and gritty violence". Scenes where dialogues mentioning and referring to the former Chief ministers J. Jayalalithaa, M. G. Ramachandran and M. Karunanidhi, where removed from the film, as it was considered defaming the politicians. Post-release, the film drew criticism for allegedly portraying the residents of North Chennai in a bad light. The film also drew controversies from fisherfolk community, because of a love-making scene between Ameer and Andrea was pictured in a boat, which was considered to be offensive for the community. Director Vetrimaaran, in a video statement, apologised to anyone who may have been hurt by the film. Then the director agreed to remove the offensive scenes from the film. The film was later dubbed Hindi as Chennai Central and released on YouTube by Goldmines Telefilms on 21 June 2020.

Reception

Box office 
The film gained $48,840 ( lakh) from the premiere shows screened in United States on 16 October, a day before the Indian release. The film further earned  from the second day at Chennai box-office, and had collected  worldwide. Within two weeks of its release, the film earned  at the worldwide box office, surpassing Velaiilla Pattadhari to emerge the highest-grossing Tamil film of Dhanush's career, until its record was broken by Asuran, another film directed by Vetrimaaran. In addition, the film crossed the  crore-mark at the Chennai box office.

Critical response 
The film was met with critical acclaim, with critics praising the story, screenplay and each actors performance. Janani K, a critic from India Today gave a rating of 4 stars (out of 5) and said that "Vada Chennai has everything you look for in a gangster thriller. But Vetri Maaran's display of twists and turns will win you over." The Indian Express-based critic Manoj Kumar R. assigned 5/5 rating for the film, saying "Vada Chennai is the closest you can get to unforgiving underworld filled with insecurity, revenge, destiny, rage and insatiable urge for bloodshed. It is not the story that stands out in Vada Chennai. It is how beautifully Vetrimaaran has captured the lifestyle of a place, which is so close and yet so far away from the advancement of modern civilization." Sowmya Rajendran, editor-in-chief of The News Minute wrote "From the colourful curses of the street to each of the characters, the film gives us a very real glimpse of gang wars. Vetrimaaran-Dhanush delivers a brilliant gangster film."

Srivatsan S, writing for The Hindu, said "The obvious political overtones that have been built throughout will have its relevance in part two. If anything, Vada Chennai reiterates why Vetri Maaran is a master storyteller." Priyanka Sundar of Hindustan Times stated the film Vada Chennai, the first part of a three-part film, "is complete in itself speaks for director’s Vetrimaaran’s execution style". She further called it as a "bloody brilliant film laced with some bone chilling moments accompanied with ingenious music". Anupama Subramanian of Deccan Chronicle gave four out of five ratings and said:

M. Suganth of The Times of India gave 4 stars (out of 5) and stated "The sprawling nature of the narrative and the various events that impact the lives of the numerous characters make Vada Chennai truly an epic." Film critic and trade analyst Sreedhar Pillai, in his review for Firstpost said "Vada Chennai is another feather on Vetrimaaran’s cap though not in the same league as his earlier films. The way he has built into the story, the rise of gangsters and thrown in political allegories is brutally honest. It also shows how politicians and the slum lords, in the name of development and welfare of the people, are similar in their opportunistic approach and selfish interests." He gave the film three-and-a-half out of five stars.

A critic from Sify, also gave the same rating and said "Vada Chennai takes its time to unfold, and you may enjoy if you muster the patience for it. Give it a chance, watch it for some excellent acting and for its gritty realistic feel." Baradwaj Rangan of Film Companion South wrote "Dhanush's ascent to stardom has come alongside his growth as an actor, and there’s not one scene where he makes us doubt his character's actions. The actors are so good (Ameer is a standout) and the film's parts are so much greater than the whole that savouring them becomes its own kind of satisfaction. With his outstanding cinematographer Velraj, Vetrimaaran unleashes one flamboyant scene after another."

Accolades

Legacy 
Bollywood director Anurag Kashyap also heaped praise on the direction and screenplay, calling it as "an original gangster film". Directors Gautham Vasudev Menon and Vineeth Sreenivasan too praised the film, the latter called Vetrimaaran as the director "needed to be celebrated". Kashyap also had the first cut of the film, along with other Tamil films being preserved in his library. In a May 2021 interview with Indian cricketer Ravichandran Ashwin, Vetrimaaran revealed about his voice-over used in the opening narrations, and said that "when the film's release date was nearing, he could not trim the film to the desired duration, so he came up with the idea of voice over only three days before the film's release date". A dialogue from the film "Senthil, Guna, Velu, Thambi ivanga ellarum Anbu vaazhkaiyoda inaikkuradhu Rajan dhan", has been used widely in internet memes.

Future 
Post Vada Chennai's success, many sources claimed about the sequel of the film, after Dhanush and Vetrimaaran collaborated for Asuran (2019). In July 2019, there were reports being surfaced that the sequel of the film will be shelved, Dhanush clarified that the sequel will progress. It was reported that the sequel will be made into a web series format instead of a feature film, as Vetrimaaran revealed that "some of the events including the 2004 Tsunami and other political incidents, had to be shown and this may overshoot the proposed budget", hence he decided to make the sequel into a digital format. Vetrimaaran also revealed that he planned the first film into a web series instead of making into a feature.

A prequel for the film titled Rajan Vagaiyara, will be based on the life of Rajan's character in the film. He originally proposed it to make it as a web-series on late-October 2018, after Vada Chennai's release, saying that "I fell in love with Rajan’s character as I was writing. His is a very fascinating personality and at one point, I wanted to make a standalone film on Rajan. The prequel idea would do full justice to his character and give it more weight." In March 2021, it was reported that the proposed web-series is currently under production, and may begin soon after Vetrimaaran's completion in the projects Viduthalai and Vaadivaasal.

Notes

References

External links 
 

2010s crime films
2010s Tamil-language films
2010s vigilante films
2018 crime films
2018 films
Films about organised crime in India
Films directed by Vetrimaaran
Films scored by Santhosh Narayanan
Films set in 1987
Films set in 1991
Films set in 1996
Films set in 2000
Films set in 2003
Films set in Chennai
Films shot in Chennai
Indian crime films
Indian films about revenge
Indian gangster films
Indian nonlinear narrative films
Indian vigilante films